This was the first edition of the tournament.

Kristie Ahn won the title, defeating Danielle Collins in the final, 6–4, 6–4.

Seeds

Draw

Finals

Top half

Bottom half

References
Main Draw

RBC Pro Challenge - Singles